The 1920 United States presidential election in South Carolina took place on November 2, 1920, as part of the 1920 United States presidential election which was held throughout all contemporary 48 states. Voters chose 9 representatives, or electors to the Electoral College, who voted for president and vice president. 

South Carolina voted for the Democratic nominee, Governor James M. Cox of Ohio, over Republican nominee, Senator Warren G. Harding of Ohio. Cox ran with Assistant Secretary of the Navy Franklin D. Roosevelt of New York, while Harding ran with Governor Calvin Coolidge of Massachusetts. 

Cox won South Carolina by a landslide margin of 96.05%. 

In the midst of a massive nationwide Republican landslide, South Carolina was a staggering 118.3% more Democratic than the national average.

Results

References

South Carolina
1920
1920 South Carolina elections